Giuseppe Radaelli (1833 - 1882) was a 19th-century Milanese fencing master and soldier. Often regarded as "the father of modern sabre fencing", his sabre fencing principles were popularised throughout Europe via his students such as Luigi Barbasetti, Ferdinando Masiello, Salvatore Pecoraro, and Carlo Pessina.

See also
 Italian school of swordsmanship
 Classical fencing
 German school of swordsmanship
 Historical European martial arts

References

External links
 From Duelling to Fencing
 The Sabre Molinello of Giuseppe Radaelli
 A Short History of Modern Fencing
 Bolognese Swordsmanship
 Bolognese Swordsmanship: The Dardi School
 Fiore Dei Liberi: 14th century Master of Defence

1833 births
1882 deaths
Italian male fencers
Fencers from Milan